Hans Ulrich Obrist (born 1968) is a Swiss art curator, critic, and historian of art. He is artistic director at the Serpentine Galleries, London. Obrist is the author of The Interview Project, an extensive ongoing project of interviews. He is also co-editor of the Cahiers d'Art review.

Life and work
Obrist was born in Weinfelden, Switzerland on May 24, 1968. At the age 23, he organized an exhibition of contemporary art in his kitchen. Some of his early projects Obrist curated for the art initiative museum in progress for example the legendary exhibition museum in progress with Alighiero Boetti on board of Austrian Airlines in 1993, Interventions in the daily newspaper Der Standard 1995 with artists like Christian Marclay, Matt Mullican and Lawrence Weiner, and Travelling Eye in the magazine Profil 1995/1996 with John Baldessari, Nan Goldin, Felix Gonzalez-Torres and Gerhard Richter amongst others. 

Obrist is also a jury member of the art project Safety Curtain, which museum in progress has been realizing at the Vienna State Opera with famous artists like Tauba Auerbach, David Hockney, Joan Jonas, Jeff Koons, Maria Lassnig, Rosemarie Trockel, Cy Twombly and Carrie Mae Weems since 1998. 

In 1993, Obrist founded the Museum Robert Walser and began to run the Migrateurs program at the Musée d'Art Moderne de la Ville de Paris where he served as a curator for contemporary art. In 1996, he co-curated Manifesta 1, the first edition of the roving European biennial of contemporary art. In the November 2009 issue of ArtReview, Obrist was ranked number one in the publication's annual list of the art world's one-hundred most powerful people and that same year he was made an Honorary Fellow of the Royal Institute of British Architects (RIBA). Obrist first gained art world attention in 1991, when as a student in Politics and Economics in St. Gallen, Switzerland, he mounted  an exhibition in the kitchen of his apartment entitled The Kitchen Show It featured work by Christian Boltanski and Peter Fischli & David Weiss. Obrist is an advocate and archivist for artists, and has said: "I really do think artists are the most important people on the planet, and if what I do is a utility and helps them, then that makes me happy. I want to be helpful." Obrist is known for his lively pace and emphasis on inclusion in all cultural activities.

While maintaining official curatorial positions, he is also the co-founder of the Brutally Early Club, a discussion group open to all that meets at Starbucks in London, Berlin, New York and Paris at 6:30 a.m., and is a contributing editor of 032c magazine, Artforum and Paradis Magazine, among others. Obrist has lectured internationally at academic and art institutions including European Graduate School in Saas-Fee, University of East Anglia, Southbank Centre, Institute of Historical Research, and Architectural Association. He lives and works in London.

The Interview project

Obrist's interest in interviews was first triggered by two very long conversations that he read when he was a student. One was between Pierre Cabanne and Marcel Duchamp, and the other between David Sylvester and Francis Bacon. "These books somehow brought me to art," he has said. "They were like oxygen, and were the first time that the idea of an interview with an artist as a medium became of interest to me. They also sparked my interest in the idea of sustained conversations—of interviews recorded over a period of time, perhaps over the course of many years; the Bacon/Sylvester interviews took place over three long sessions, for example."

So far, nearly 2000 hours of interviews have been recorded. This fascinating archive is referred to by Obrist as "an endless conversation". He began publishing these interviews in Artforum in 1996 and in 2003 eleven of these interviews were released as Interviews Volume 1. Volume 2 was published in Summer 2010. With the release, a total of 69 artists, architects, writers, film-makers, scientists, philosophers, musicians and performers share their unique experiences and frank insights.

The longer interviews in Obrist's archive are being published singly in ongoing series of books entitled "The Conversation Series". Thus far, 28 books have been published, each containing a lengthy interview with cultural figures including John Baldessari, Zaha Hadid, Dominique Gonzalez-Foerster, Yoko Ono, Robert Crumb and Rem Koolhaas. A number of Obrist's interviews have also appeared in the Berlin culture magazine 032c, including those with artists Elaine Sturtevant and Richard Hamilton, historian Eric Hobsbawm, and structural engineer Cecil Balmond of Arup.

Curatorial activities

Obrist's practice includes an ongoing exploration of the history of art institutions and curatorial practice. In his early 20s he began to research the topic. "At a certain moment, when I started doing my own shows, I felt it would be really interesting to know what is the history of my profession. I realized that there was no book, which was kind of a shock." He has since helped to rectify this gap with exhibitions on curating and a book entitled A Brief History of Curating. This volume, which is part of Obrist's Interviews project (see above) compiles interviews from some of the leading curators of the 20th century.

While the history of exhibitions has started, in this last decade, to be examined more in depth, what remains largely unexplored are the ties that interconnected manifestations have created among curators, institutions, and artists. For this reason, Obrist's conversations go beyond stressing the remarkable achievements of a few individuals...Obrist's collected volume pieces together "a patchwork of fragments," underlining a network of relationships within the art.

In keeping with his desire to explore the world of art and view it as an open system, Obrist has long advocated a participatory model for his activities. One early project, 1997's "do it", is an ongoing exhibition  that consists of instructions set out by artists for anyone to follow. In his introduction to the project, Obrist notes that "do it stems from an open exhibition model, and exhibition in progress. Individual instructions can open empty spaces for occupation and invoke possibilities for the interpretations and rephrasing of artworks in a totally free manner. do it effects interpretations based on location, and calls for a dovetailing of local structures with the artworks themselves. The diverse cities in which do it takes place actively construct the artwork context and endow it with their individual marks or distinctions."(sic)

In 2003, Obrist curated "Utopia Station" (a section of the Venice Biennale) and was briefly interviewed about the project in Sarah Thornton's Seven Days in the Art World. In 2007, Obrist co-curated Il Tempo del Postino with Philippe Parreno for the Manchester International Festival, also presented at Art Basel, 2009, organised by Fondation Beyeler and Theater Basel. In the same year, the Van Alen Institute awarded him the New York Prize Senior Fellowship for 2007–2008. In 2008 he curated Everstill at the Lorca House in Granada.

More recently, Obrist initiated a series of "marathons", a series of public events he conceived in Stuttgart in 2005. The first in the Serpentine series, the Interview Marathon in 2006, involved interviews with leading figures in contemporary culture over 24 hours, conducted by Obrist and architect Rem Koolhaas. This was followed by the Experiment Marathon, conceived by Obrist and artist Olafur Eliasson in 2007, which included 50 experiments by speakers across both arts and science, including Peter Cook, Neil Turok, Kim Gordon, Simone Forti, Fia Backstrom and Joseph Grigely. There was also the Manifesto Marathon in 2008 and the Poetry Marathon in 2009, which consisted of poems read aloud by artists and writers including Gilbert & George, Tracey Emin, Nick Laird, Geoffrey Hill, and James Fenton.

The 2014 Extinction Marathon: Visions of the Future linked the humanities and the sciences to discussions of environmental and human impact on the world today. It was programmed with artist Gustav Metzger whose research addresses issues of extinction and climate change. Notable participants included artists Etel Adnan, Ed Atkins, Jesse Darling, Gilbert & George, Katja Novitskova, Yoko Ono, Susan Hiller, Marguerite Humeau, Trevor Paglen, Cornelia Parker amongst notable model and actor Lily Cole and founder of The Whole Earth Catalog and co-founder of The Long Now Foundation Stewart Brand.

Other activities
 Kino der Kunst Festival, member of the board of trustees (since 2013)
 Museum Berggruen, member of the international council
 Thyssen-Bornemisza Art Contemporary, member of the advisory board
 Ullens Center for Contemporary Art (UCCA), member of the advisory board (2014–2015)
 Locarno Festival, member of the jury (2012)
 Manifesta, member of the supervisory board (1994–2002)

Publications by Obrist

References

External links
 Hans Ulrich Obrist: the art of curation, Interviews by Stuart Jeffries and Nancy Groves at The Guardian, Sunday 23 March 2014
 Texts and curated projects by Hans Ulrich Obrist at museum in progress

Interview videos
Ulrich-obrist-part-1-4103282 Vernissage TV interview with Hans Ulrich Obrist, 2010
NOW Interview with Kazuyo Sejima & Associates at Architecture Biennale, 2010
NOW Interview with OMA Office for Metropolitan Architecture at Architecture Biennale, 2010
Interview with SANAA at Serpentine Pavilion, 2009
Interview with Hans Ulrich Obrist on 'do it' project, 2009
Conversation with Eric Hobsbawm at the Manifesto Marathon, 2008

Living people
1968 births
Swiss art critics
Swiss expatriates in England
Swiss art curators
Cultural historians
Academic staff of European Graduate School